A powership (or power ship) is a special purpose ship, on which a power plant is installed to serve as a power generation resource.

Converted from existing ships, powerships are self-propelled, ready to go infrastructure for developing countries that plug into national grids where required. Unmotorised powerships, known as power barges, are power plants installed on a deck barge. These are sometimes called "floating power plants" or "barge mounted power plants". They were initially developed during World War II by General Electric for the War Production Board as a transportable large-scale power generation resource.

Powerships or power barges can be equipped with single or multiple gas turbines, reciprocating diesel and gas engines, boilers or nuclear reactors for electricity generation. Bureau Veritas, an international certification agency with experience in overseeing both shipbuilding and power plant development, classifies such floating power plants as "special service power plants".

History

The idea came to the president of the Augusta firm, when one winter a severe winter storm took out a lot of the New England major power transmission lines. The role of the Jacona would be to dock as near as possible to the affected area and hook into the local power grid, restoring power. During the summer months the Jacona would hook into vacation area power grids where power needs are extremely low during off season and extremely high during the summer vacation season. The Jacona was fitted with steam boilers which drove two generators which could produce 10 MW each.

Saranac was a 1942 built fleet oiler before her conversion into a powership following the Second World War to serve in the US Navy and Army. In 1957, she was sold to Hugo Neu Corporation of New York City and was used then as a power facility abroad by the International Steel and Metal Corporation. In 1959, she was renamed Somerset.

The first floating nuclear reactor ship was the MH-1A, used in the Panama canal zone from 1968 to 1975. This ship (named Sturgis) was decommissioned and scrapped over the period of 2015 to 2019.

Power barges and powerships offer a number of advantages over other forms of power plant. Due to their mobility, powerships can be connected to local power grids to temporarily cover demands whenever on site power plants are insufficient or the building of new power plants will take time, while dual-fuel engines on board can be powered by either liquid fuels or gas. The power barge and powership are able to use any infrastructure available at the site on which she is required.

Today
 

Some recently built powerships are existing large bulk carriers, which are fitted with used reciprocating engines and new state-of-the-art, large-bore dual-fuel diesel engines that run on heavy fuel or natural gas to generate electricity, relevant transformers and electric switchboards. The only other powerships were based on US Naval vessels. Powerships utilizing new purpose built ships would not be competitive to a purpose built power barge due to the higher cost of construction. The crew quarters and propulsion systems are under-utilized during the power plant operational period which can be up to the life of the power plant.

It is expected that a power barge or powership could moor at one place for an average duration of three to five years on a lease, or up to 20 years under a PPA. For this reason, powerships if constructed already, are a solution to bridge the gap for a certain time until a local power plant is built or the high demand in electricity supply is over.

Karadeniz Powership Co. Ltd., trading as Karpowership, a subsidiary of Karadeniz Energy Group based in Turkey, developed and carries out a project named "Power of Friendship" that aims to provide a total of 2,010 MW of electricity to more than ten shortage-stricken countries in the Middle East, northern Africa and south Asia with ten different ships by the end of 2010. The first powership of the project, which can supply 144 MW power, went into service at the beginning of 2010 off the shore near Basra in south-eastern Iraq, and the second powership is on its way to the same place. The company also signed a contract with Pakistan, but the Pakistani government terminated this project. This case is now being heard in the World Bank Tribunal.

All other builders of powerships have gone out of business as power barges have proved to be more cost effective.

During the 1990s, power barges became a popular way of providing energy to developing nations, with companies building power barges including equipment suppliers like General Electric, Westinghouse, Wärtsilä, and MAN; and by developers such as Smith Cogeneration, AES, GMR Vasavi, which operate floating power plants for customers located in New York City (United States), Khulna (Bangladesh), the Dominican Republic, Brazil, Ecuador, Angola, Nigeria, Thailand, Effassu (Ghana), as well as in the Philippines, Jamaica, Kenya and Malaysia. Engineering, procurement and construction companies such Power Barge Corporation, Waller Marine Inc, Hyundai, IHI Corporation and Mitsui offer gas turbine power barge construction programs, and Karadeniz Energy, MAN and Wärtsilä offer medium speed engine power barges.

Today there are over 75 power barges deployed and operating around the world. The utilization rate of power barges is around 95% with only one or two power barges available in the global market at any one time.

In April 2011, Waller Marine finalized installation in Venezuela of two large floating power generation barges into a prepared basin at Tacoa. The two 171 MW barges, each supporting a GE 7FA dual fuel industrial gas turbine, are connected to the grid and soon supply much needed power to Caracas. Power Barge Corporation recently delivered a 96 MW gas turbine power barge to Angola, a 72 MW Wartsila power barge to Panama and a 105 MW gas turbine power barge to Venezuela.  

In 2010s Russia has built a large nuclear power barge Akademik Lomonosov, which was used to replace the aging Bilibino Nuclear Power Plant in the Northeastern Chukotka region. Since the late 2019, it is in operation in the city of Pevek, supplying the nearby gold mines and settlements. In 2018, two Chinese companies announced that they would build a fleet of nuclear power barges for the South China Sea islands.

See also 
 MH-1A, a floating power station constructed as part of the Army Nuclear Power Program
 Floating nuclear power station
 Floating wind turbine

References

External links

Fuel systems for powership (fuel saving, waste sludge, reduce the cost of operation)